The 120-pounder Whitworth naval gun was designed by Joseph Whitworth during the 1860s. It was a rifled muzzle loader and used his hexagonal rifled bore design, the principle of which is described in the article on the 70-pounder Whitworth naval gun.

Service
A number of 120-pounders were bought by the Imperial Brazilian Navy and used to arm some of its ironclads during the Paraguayan War in the late 1860s.

Notes

References

 Alexander Lyman Holley, "A Treatise on Ordnance and Armor" published by D. Van Nostrand, New York, 1865

Naval guns of the United Kingdom